Inegen (İynegen) is a rural locality (a selo) in Ongudaysky District, the Altai Republic, Russia. The population was 176 as of 2016. There are 5 streets.

Geography 
Inegen is located 88 km southeast of Onguday (the district's administrative centre) by road. Inya is the nearest rural locality.

References 

Rural localities in Ongudaysky District